Ricardo Chile-Fonte (born 7 January 1982) is a Cuban former professional tennis player.

Debuting in 2000, Chile appeared in 17 ties for the Cuba Davis Cup team, winning 12 singles and 6 doubles rubbers for his country. His Davis Cup career included a five-set win over Uruguay's Pablo Cuevas.

Chile represented Cuba at the 2003 Pan American Games in Santo Domingo and won two bronze medals at the 2006 Central American and Caribbean Games, both in doubles events.

References

External links
 
 
 

1982 births
Living people
Cuban male tennis players
Tennis players at the 2003 Pan American Games
Pan American Games competitors for Cuba
Competitors at the 2006 Central American and Caribbean Games
Central American and Caribbean Games bronze medalists for Cuba
Central American and Caribbean Games medalists in tennis
20th-century Cuban people
21st-century Cuban people